Jane is a 1915 American silent film produced by the Oliver Morosco company and distributed by Paramount Pictures. It is based on a stage play Jane by W.H. Lestocq and Harry Nicholls. Frank Lloyd directed, early in his career, and up-and-coming stage comic Charlotte Greenwood debuts and stars in her first motion picture. This was Lloyd's second directed feature film after several years of making shorts. This film survives in the Library of Congress.

Cast
Charlotte Greenwood - Jane
Sydney Grant - William Tipson
Myrtle Stedman - Lucy Norton
Forrest Stanley - Charles Shackleton
Howard Davies - Colonel Norton
Herbert Standing - Andrew Kershaw
Lydia Yeamans Titus - Mrs. Chadwick
Syd de Grey - Henry Jardine

References

External links
Jane at IMDb.com
still or lantern portrait
larger version of production still
 Paramount ad cover

1915 films
American silent feature films
American films based on plays
Films directed by Frank Lloyd
1915 comedy films
American black-and-white films
Silent American comedy films
Surviving American silent films
1910s American films